is a national university in Kitami, Hokkaido, Japan. Founded as the Kitami Junior College of Technology on 6 January 1960, it was chartered as a university (Kitami Institute of Technology) on 6 January 1966. In 2004, it became part of the National University Corporation.

Notable alumni 

 Akiko Kiso - classical scholar

References

External links 

Japanese national universities
Educational institutions established in 1966
Universities and colleges in Hokkaido
Engineering universities and colleges in Japan
1966 establishments in Japan